Sauter is a surname of German origin. The name refers to:
 Al Sauter (1868–1928), Major League Baseball infielder
 Anton Eleutherius Sauter (1800–1881), Austrian botanist
 Björn Sauter (b. 1984), German race car engineer (Formula SAE)
 Christian Sauter (born 1988), German professional footballer
 Christian Sauter (born 1980), German politician
 Christoph Sauter (born 1991) German footballer   
 Cory Sauter (born 1974), American professional football player
 Doug Sauter  (born 1954), retired Canadian ice hockey coach
 Ernest Sauter (1928–2013), German composer
 Eddie Sauter (1914–1981), American music composer and jazz arranger
 Fritz Sauter (1906–1983), Austrian-German physicist
 Georg Sauter (1866–1937), German-English painter, lithographer and draftsman
 Glenn Sauter (born 1959), Syndicated radio show host
 Hans Sauter (1871-1943), a German entomologist and ichthyologist
 Hardy Sauter (born 1971), Canadian former ice hockey defenseman and coach
 Jay Sauter (born 1962), American race car driver
 Jim Sauter (contemporary), American saxophonist
 Jim Sauter (1943–2014), American race car driver
 Joachim Sauter (1959–2021), German media artist and designer
 Johnny Sauter (born 1978), American race car driver
 Otto Sauter (born 1961), German trumpet soloist
 Otto Sauter-Sarto (1884–1958), German actor
 Peeter Sauter (born 1962), Estonian actor and author
 Thilo Sauter, Austrian engineer
 Tim Sauter (born 1964), American race car driver
 Travis Sauter (born 1982), American stock car racing driver
 Vicki Sauter (born 1955), American management scientist
 Wilhelm Sauter  (1896–1848), German painter

See also 
 Sauter (disambiguation)